U.S. Bicycle Route 90 (USBR 90) is an east–west U.S. Bicycle Route in Arizona and Florida. The American Association of State Highway and Transportation Officials (AASHTO) ultimately plans to extend the route to San Diego, California from its current eastern terminus on the Atlantic Coast south of Jacksonville, Florida.

Route description

Arizona

Florida

History
USBR 90 was established in November 2014 with the official designation of the  Florida section.  Its  section through Arizona was approved in September 2015.

Auxiliary routes

U.S. Bicycle Route 90A

U.S. Bicycle Route 90A is an  alternate route following U.S. Route 90 through Pensacola, Florida.

References

External links

90
Bike paths in Arizona
Bike paths in Florida
2014 establishments in the United States
2014 establishments in Florida
2015 establishments in Arizona